Vincotto is a dark, sweet, thick paste produced in rural areas of Italy. It is made by the slow cooking and reduction over many hours of non-fermented grape must until it has been reduced to about one-fifth of its original volume and the sugars present have caramelized. It can be made from a number of varieties of local red wine grapes, including Primitivo, Negroamaro and Malvasia Nera, and before the grapes are picked they are allowed to wither naturally on the vine for about thirty days. In Roman times it was known as sapa in Latin and epsima in Greek, the same names that are often used for it in Italy and Cyprus, respectively, today.

The paste is made in the Emilia Romagna, Veneto, Lombardy, Apulia, Basilicata, Sardinia and Marche regions of Italy.

Description

Although it may be used as a basis to make sweet vinegar, vincotto has a pleasant flavor and is not a type of vinegar. This additional product is called a Vinegar of Vincotto, Vincotto vinegar, or Vincotto balsamic and can be used in the same way as a good mellow Balsamic vinegar.

Vincotto appears to be related to defrutum and other forms of grape juice boiled down to varying strengths (carenum, sapa) that were produced in Ancient Rome. Defrutum was used to preserve, sweeten, and/or flavor many foods (including wine), by itself or with honey or garum. Defrutum was also consumed as a drink when diluted with water, or fermented into a heady Roman "wine". (Note: defrutum should not be confused with passum, a wine made from fermented raisins that originated in ancient Carthage and was popular in ancient Rome. Passum was therefore more similar to modern Vin Santo than to vincotto.)

Over many centuries, the vincotto produced in Basilicata and the Salento area of Apulia, was further developed into several different varieties of higher quality and culinary sophistication and is produced from the slow reduction together of a blend of cooked grape must and of a wine that has started to spoil and sour attaining the consistency of dense non-alcoholic syrup. This tradition goes back to the times of the ancient Romans when grape musts were reduced over heat to facilitate conservation and transportation. 

In Basilicata, vincotto is a key ingredient of several traditional dishes such as lagana chiapputa, pasta with walnuts, almonds, pine nuts and raisin, and pan minisc''', a dessert enriched with flour, sugar, and spices.

In more recent times, from 1863, Salento greatly expanded the vineyards which also led to a great increase in the production of Vincotto. Vincotto can be used as a sweet condiment, as well as being sparingly drizzled over strongly flavored foods such as game, roast meats and poultry, aged cheeses, and risotto. Due to the nature of the Apulian red grapes, wines are produced with very high polyphenol counts. These work as antioxidants and are good for health, and act as strong natural flavour enhancers when added to other ingredients in a culinary recipe.

Vincotto without the added vinegar and vino cotto are synonymous, as it is called vino cotto in southern Italian regions such as Calabria.  These names cannot be registered as a trademark by any producer.

In Greek, vincotto is called petimezi and is only produced in Crete.

In Croatia, this product is called varenik, and is produced on the Dalmatian islands and in the Dubrovnik and Skradin region.

In South Africa, it is known as moskonfyt'' (Afrikaans for grape must jam) and is produced in the Western Cape province.

Agrodolce vinegars based on vincotto
Like a dense sweet balsamic "vinegar", the balsamic vincotto Agrodolce version can also be used to dress salads and season cooked vegetables, and can even be used in desserts such as fruits or ice cream.

These are produced by blending a sweet matured vincotto with vinegar produced from the same red grape varieties.  The resulting product is allowed to mature for several more months until it becomes "legato", which means "smooth".  The result is an Apulian balsamic vinegar that can be used in the same way as a balsamic vinegar of Modena, although it does have some additional properties. Red Apulian grapes and wines exhibit a very high polyphenol count, and these act as antioxidants and as a natural flavour enhancer with other foods. They can enhance other flavours when used in a recipe, while not overpowering them, and as is usually the case with other balsamic vinegars, they can be reduced over heat without any bitter caramelization.

Aromatized versions
Calogiuri vincotti are also produced in a variety of aromatized or flavoured versions in much in the same way as flavoured extra virgin olive oils.  Locally grown fruits are used, including fig, carob, quince, lemon, orange, raspberry, or chili pepper. This is an adaptation of traditional Apulian vincotto, but should not be confused with the understanding of generic Apulian vincotti.

See also

Balsamic vinegar
Gastrique
 List of grape dishes
Vinegar

References

Condiments
Apulia
Cuisine of Basilicata
Italian cuisine
Calabria
Grape dishes